Michael Patrick Ryan  (June 7, 1868 – September 13, 1935) was a third baseman for the St. Louis Browns of the National League in 1895.

External links
 

1868 births
1935 deaths
19th-century baseball players
St. Louis Browns (NL) players
Baseball players from Missouri
Major League Baseball third basemen